Margum may refer to the following ancient Roman places and jurisdictions in the Balkans:

 Margum Dubravica, a fortress and garrison in Roman province Moesia Superior, now at Orašje hamlet in Dubravica, Serbia, at the mouth of the Great Morava on the Danube
 , Roman fortress on the opposite bank of the Danube near Kovin

See also 
 Margus (disambiguation)
 List of Catholic dioceses in Bosnia and Herzegovina
 List of Catholic titular sees